The Men's shot put at the 2015 Asian Athletics Championships was held on June 3.

Results

References
Results

Shot
Shot put at the Asian Athletics Championships